David John Maynier (born 22 October 1968) is a South African politician who has been the Western Cape Provincial Minister of Education since May 2022 and a Member of the Western Cape Provincial Parliament since May 2019. He served as the Western Cape Provincial Minister of Finance and Economic Opportunities from May 2019 to May 2022. Maynier was a Member of Parliament from 2009 to 2019, where he was Shadow Minister of Finance from 2015 to 2019 and the Shadow Minister of Defence and Military Veterans from 2009 to 2015.

Background 

Maynier matriculated from Grey High School in Port Elizabeth, and holds a Bachelor of Arts (Honours) degree from the University of Cape Town and a master's degree in Public Administration and Management from Harvard's Kennedy School of Government. He is a former submarine officer and navy diver in the South African Navy.

Maynier joined the Democratic Alliance as a researcher in 1999 and quickly rose to the position of Director of Research. In August 2000 he became Chief of Staff to party leader Tony Leon - a position he served until June 2004, when he became Assistant to the Chairperson of the Federal Executive. In February 2005 he was again promoted to Director of Fundraising, and he was awarded the party's 'Top Fundraiser of the Year' award at the 2007 Federal Congress, after modernising and professionalising the party's fundraising system. In 2008, he was appointed the DA's Deputy CEO with special responsibility for the Western Cape, the province where the DA has its strongest support base in South Africa. In 2009 he was the party's Campaign Manager in the Western Cape for the 2009 general election. The party won 51.3% of the vote in the province—up significantly from 27% in 2004. The result allowed Helen Zille to become Premier of the Western Cape, and saw the DA take control of the provincial legislature in an alliance with the Independent Democrats.

Member of Parliament 

After managing the DA's successful Western Cape electoral campaign, Maynier became a Member of Parliament, after appearing eleventh on the party's Western Cape national list. Following the election he was appointed Shadow Minister of Defence and Military Veterans. In his maiden speech to Parliament, Maynier issued a damning critique of the National Defence Force's state of combat readiness—telling Defence Minister Lindiwe Sisulu:

On 2 August 2009, Maynier announced that a crisis in South Africa's National Conventional Arms Control Committee had resulted in weapons deals being conducted between South African firms and rogue states like North Korea, Iran and Libya. This included the committee authorising the sale of radar detectors for use on North Korean submarines, and aviator G-suits to Iran.

On 27 March 2013 Maynier led the thrust for a parliamentary inquiry into the SANDF's intervention in the Central African Republic coup.

In 2015, Maynier was appointed Shadow Minister of Finance by the new DA leader Mmusi Maimane.

In March 2019, the Democratic Alliance revealed their election lists for the 2019 elections. Maynier was announced as a candidate for the Western Cape Provincial Parliament. He left Parliament on 7 May 2019.

Western Cape provincial government
On 22 May 2019, Maynier was sworn in as a Member of the Western Cape Provincial Parliament. The following day, 23 May 2019, he was named the new Provincial Minister of Finance and Economic Opportunities.

On 9 December 2019, Maynier announced the establishment of a task team to address congestion issues at the Port of Cape Town container terminal.

On 22 April 2022, premier Alan Winde announced that Maynier would be taking over from Debbie Schäfer as the Provincial Minister of Education when she leaves office on 15 May 2022. DA chief whip Mireille Wenger would then replace Maynier as the Provincial Minister of Finance and Economic Opportunities. Maynier officially became the Provincial Minister of Education 16 May 2022 as the changes made by premier Winde took effect.

References 

Living people
Democratic Alliance (South Africa) politicians
1968 births
Members of the National Assembly of South Africa
Harvard Kennedy School alumni
University of Cape Town alumni
Mason Fellows